Petronilla Melusina von der Schulenburg, Countess of Walsingham, Countess of Chesterfield (1 April 1693 – 16 September 1778) was the natural daughter of King George I of Great Britain and his longtime mistress, Melusine von der Schulenburg, Duchess of Kendal.

Biography 
In 1722, Melusina was created Baroness Aldborough and Countess of Walsingham as a life peer. After the death of her father in 1727, she lived mainly with her mother at Kendal House in Isleworth.

In Isleworth, Middlesex, on 5 September 1733 she married Philip Stanhope, 4th Earl of Chesterfield, a leading Whig politician. The couple had no children, but it is said that "family letters" suggest that Melusina may have been the mother, through an intimacy with Charles Calvert, 5th Baron Baltimore, of Benedict Swingate Calvert. Calvert was born in England in around 1730–32, the illegitimate son of Charles Calvert, 5th Baron Baltimore. His mother's identity is otherwise unknown.

References

Bibliography
 Washington, George Sydney Horace Lee, p. 176, "The Royal Stuarts in America" New England Historical and Genealogical Register (July 1950).

1693 births
1778 deaths
Melusina
Illegitimate children of British monarchs
Children of George I of Great Britain
English countesses
English people of German descent
18th-century English people
17th-century English women
17th-century English people
18th-century English women
Earls in the Peerage of Great Britain
Life peeresses created by George I
Schulenburg family
Daughters of kings